List of deputy chairmen of the Polish Council of State.

The deputy chairmen of the Polish Council of State were deputy heads of state of the People's Republic of Poland 1952–1989.

This is a list of office-holders:

Term 1952–1957

Term 1957–1961

Term 1961–1965

Term 1965–1969

Term 1969–1972

Term 1972–1976

Term 1976–1980

Term 1980–1985

Term 1985–1989

References
 Zgapedia - Rada panstwa

External links
Polish Wikipedia article about the Council of State

Politics of Poland
Poland